Number 37 (Nommer 37  in South Africa)is a 2018 South-African movie written and directed by Nosipho Dumisa. The film is in Afrikaans and subtitled to English. It was featured at several film festivals including SXSW, the Neuchâtel International Fantastic Film Festival, the Sydney Film Festival, and the Fantasia International Film Festival in Montreal, where it won Best Director.

Plot
An injured young man, confined to his apartment, borrows his girlfriend's binoculars to spy on their neighbourhood and sees an opportunity to turn their lives around after witnessing a crime.

Cast
 Irshaad Ally (as Randal Hendricks)
 Danny Ross (as Emmie)
 Monique Rockman (as girlfriend Pam)
 Ephraim Gordon (as Warren)
 Amrain Ismail-Essop (as Alicia)

References

External links

South African thriller films
2018 films
Afrikaans-language films